Pudupatti is a village in Pappakudi block in Tirunelveli district of Tamil Nadu, India. It is located 26 km towards west from District headquarters Tirunelveli, 11 km from Pappakudi, 651 km from state capital Chennai.

Pudupatti Pin code is 627851 and postal head office is Alangulam.

Nallur ( 4 km ), Sevalarkulam ( 5 km ), Andipatti ( 6 km ), Oodaimarichan ( 7 km ), Naranapuram ( 7 km ) are the nearby Villages to Pudupatti. Pudupatti is surrounded by Pappakudi Block towards South, Kadayam Block towards west, Keelapavoor Block towards west, Ambasamudram Block towards South.

Vikramasingapuram, Surandai, Tenkasi, Tirunelveli are the nearby cities to Pudupatti.

Pudupatti 2011 census details 
Pudupatti local language is Tamil. Pudupatti village total population is 5171 and number of houses are 1359. Female Population is 51.1%. Village literacy rate is 67.7% and the female literacy rate is 31.5%.

Population

Politics in Pudupatti 
DMK, AIADMK, ADMK,NTK,INC are the major political parties in this area.

Polling stations /booths near Pudupatti 
T.d.t.a. Middle School 
T.d.t.a.middle School Additional Building North Portion Pethanadarpatti. 
Panchayat Union Primary School East Building South Portion Maruthampudur 
T.d.t.a.middle School North Building East Portion 
T.d.t.a Primary School South Portion Sadaiyappapuram Mukkudal.

How to reach Pudupatti

By rail 
There is no railway station near Pudupatti in less than 10 km.

Education

Colleges near Pudupatti 
Ithaya Jyothi College of Nursing Address :Caussanelpuram, konganthanparai - Post, tirunelveli - 627007

S.veerachamy College of Engineering and Technology Address :Puliangudi

P.s.r. Engineering College Address :P.s.r. Engineering College, Near By Sivakasi.

Gomathi Ambal Polytechnic College Malaiyadikurichi Address :Maaveeran Poolithevar Nagar Maliyadikurichi.

Sri Parasakthi Women's College Address :

Schools in Pudupatti 
Hindu Tirumurugan Middle School Address :Hindu Tirumurugan Middle School, Santhai Market. Pudupatti

Sub Villages in Pudupatti 

Adi dravida colony

Ramnagar

Kasi nathapuram

Hospitals in Pudupatti

Ram Hospital 
MDR922; Pudupatti; Tamil Nadu 627851; India 
0.9 km distance

primary health center 
Maruthamputhur; Tamil Nadu 627851; India 
2.1 km distance

ஜோசப் மருத்துவமனை 
Alangulam; Tamil Nadu 627851; India 
4.2 km distance

Maniram Hospital 
Alangulam; Tamil Nadu 627851; India 
4.5 km distance

Economy

Petrol Bunks in Pudupatti,Pappakudi

Indian Oil Petrol Pump 
Aaladi Patti; Tirunelveli; SH-39; Tirunelveli Sengottai Kollam Road; Tirunelveli; Tirunelveli; 627851; India 
4.3 km distance

Rathinam Nadar Agency - Indiane Oil Pertrol Pump 
Sivakasi - Alangulam Road; Alangulam; Tamil Nadu 627851; India 
5.0 km distance

SRI BHARATH AGENCIES 
ALANKULAM; SH39; TIRUNELVELI; Tamil Nadu 627851; India 
5.1 km distance

Indian Oil Petrol Pump 
Alangulam; Tirunelveli; SH-39; Tirunelveli Sengottai Kollam Road; Tirunelveli; Tirunelveli; Tamil Nadu 627808; India 
5.5 km distance

Colleges in Pudupatti,Pappakudi

St. Mariam Polytechnic College 
Tenkasi – Tirunelveli Road; Alangulam; Sivalarkulam Village; Tirunelveli; Tamil Nadu 627851; India 
4.8 km distance

Aaladi Aruna College of Nursing 
tirunelveli; aalangulam; Tirunelveli; Tamil Nadu 627754; India 
4.9 km distance

St Mariyam Polytechnic College 
Tirunelveli; Tamil Nadu 627001; India 
4.9 km distance

Arul Medicals ;Alangulam 
; Alangulam; Tamil Nadu 627851; India 
5.2 km distance

Schools in Pudupatti,Pappakudi

ST.PAULS CHURCH 
Pudupatti; Tamil Nadu 627851; India 
1.0 km distance

TDTA Middle school 
Pudupatti; Tamil Nadu 627851; India 
1.1 km distance

Puddupatti School 
MDR922; Pudupatti; Tamil Nadu 627851; India 
1.1 km distance

hindu thirumurugan high school 
Pudupatti; Tamil Nadu 627851; India 
1.2 km distance

Kulanthai Yeasu Church 
Ram Nagar; Tamil Nadu 627851; India 
2.4 km distance

Electronic Shops in Pudupatti,Pappakudi

Vetri Vel Auto Mobiles 
Ram Nagar; Tamil Nadu 627851; India 
2.3 km distance

Vinayaga Auto Works 
Ambasamudram-Alangulam Rd; Kuthapanjan; Tamil Nadu 627851; India 
2.5 km distance

Lingson TV Centre 
No. 46/3; Walaja Road; Sholinghur; Tamil Nadu 631102; India 
4.3 km distance

Super Markets in Pudupatti,Pappakudi

Jesumani Store; Kandapatti 
Maruthamputhur; Tamil Nadu 627851; India 
2.6 km distance

Mani Road 
Alangulam; Tamil Nadu 627851; India 
4.8 km distance

Thaiyal Nayagi Vegetable Market 
Sivakasi - Alangulam Road; Alangulam; Tamil Nadu 627851; India 
5.0 km distance

Local Parks in Pudupatti,Pappakudi

ராமசாமி தோட்டம் 
Kuthapanjan; Tamil Nadu 627851; India 
2.9 km distance

NSAK BUILDING 
Alangulam; Tamil Nadu 627851; India 
4.5 km distance

Green Park 
Pappakudi; Tamil Nadu 627602; India 
6.1 km distance

Police Stations near Pudupatti,Pappakudi

Police Station 
Tenkasi Road; SH 40; Alangulam; Tamil Nadu 627851; India 
4.6 km distance

Women's Police Station 
Alangulam; Tamil Nadu 627851; India 
5.0 km distance

Police Quarters 
Tenkasi Rd; Alangulam; Tamil Nadu 627851; India 
5.2 km distance

Government offices near Pudupatti, Pappakudi

Maruthamputhur 
Maruthamputhur; Alangulam(Tk); Tirunelveli; Tamil Nadu - 627851; India 
2.1 km distance

Village Panchayat Service Centre; Sivalarkulam 
Sivalarkulam; Tamil Nadu 627853; India 
6.3 km distance

Seyathu Beedi 
Muthumalaipuram; Tamil Nadu 627851; India 
6.6 km distance

References 

Villages in Tirunelveli district